Phenomenon is the second studio album by Christian rock band Thousand Foot Krutch, and their first project on Tooth & Nail Records. The album was released on September 30, 2003. It displays a different style than the band's previous album, with less rapping and instead, a fusion of modern rock and nu metal.

Track listing
All songs written by Trevor McNevan, Steve Augustine and Joel Bruyere. The album was recorded in 2003.

Personnel 
Credits adapted from the CD liner notes.

Thousand Foot Krutch
Trevor McNevan – vocals, guitar, producer
 Joel Bruyere – bass guitar, producer
 Steve Augustine – drums, producer
Technical

Aaron Sprinkle – producer, engineer, additional guitars
 Latif Taylor - engineer
Jason Corsaro - drum engineer
J.R. McNeely - mixing at Compound Recording (1-2, 4-7, 9-12)
Ben Grosse - mixing (3, 8)
Zach Hodges - mixing assistant
Steve Chahley - drum mixing assistant
Brandon Ebel - executive producer

Artwork

 Asterik Studio - art direction and design
 David Johnson - band photography

Reception
 "Rawkfist", "Faith, Love and Happiness", and "This Is a Call" were top 10 hits on the Christian hit radio format; "Rawkfist" entered the top 40 on mainstream rock radio.
 The album has sold over 250,000 units.
 Both "Phenomenon" and "Rawkfist" reached No. 1 on ChristianRock.Net in 2003–2004. "Bounce" was also a No. 1 on ChristianRock.Net.

References

Thousand Foot Krutch albums
2003 albums
Tooth & Nail Records albums
Albums produced by Aaron Sprinkle